Few English words are known to come directly from Brittonic.  More can be proven to derive from Gaulish, which arrived through Norman French, often strengthened in form and use by Church/state Latin.

This list omits words of Celtic origin coming from later forms of Brittonic and intermediate tongues:
 See Gaulish (e.g. ambassador, bound, car, carpenter, piece), via Norman/Old French
Other Continental Celtic (e.g. down), via Germanic 
 See List of English words of Welsh origin a list which includes Cornish  (e.g. coracle; crag; corgi (type of dog), likely flannel; likely gull (type of bird), iron, lawn, wrasse (type of fish))
 See Gaelic (e.g. keening, bog, bother, hubbub, glen, clan)
 See Breton (chiefly local terms in archaeology: dolmen, menhir)

List
Academia recognises beyond all reasonable doubt "fewer than ten" Brittonic loan-words in English that are neither historic nor obsolete. The following list derives mainly from surveys of possible Brittonic loanwords in English by Richard Coates, Dieter Kastovsky, and D. Gary Miller. Etymologies from the Oxford English Dictionary are included to indicate the view of this authoritative (but not necessarily definitive) source, distinguishing between the first, second, third  and online editions. Words that are the most widely accepted as Brittonic loans are in bold.

In extinct uses, seven main others are proposed, mainly by Andrew Breeze, seen in Old English. Though less controversial than others, some of the seven have been disputed:
 funta 'fountain, spring.' Latin fontana and Church Latin (still used) font loaned into Brittonic and borrowed from either/both into Old English. Used in nine sets of settlements across counties west of London and east of Gillingham, Dorset: (Bedfont, (the) Chalfont(s), Mottisfont, Fonthill Bishop, Fontmell Magna, Fontwell, Teffont and Urchfont). Phrase the 'fount of all wisdom/knowledge' is cognate, seen to endure as a shorthand, poetic form of fountain.
 luh 'pool', in use in the Northumbrian dialect of Old English. The modern English cognate, 'loch', is taken from Scottish Gaelic.
 milpæþ 'army road', the first element of which is possibly from the Brittonic ancestor of Welsh mil 'thousand, army'.
 prass 'pomp, array', perhaps from the Brittonic ancestor of Welsh pres 'soldiers in array'.
 stor 'incense, wax'. However, the Oxford English Dictionary regards it as a Latin loan.
 toroc 'bung.' Highly disputed. Possibly not even an English word─or an English word but not of Celtic origin.
 wassenas 'retainers', possibly from Brittonic.

See also

 Brittonicisms in English
 Celtic language-death in England

References

External links
 Why Don't the English Speak Welsh? - Hildegard Tristram

British